= SAFTAG =

SAFTAG is the primary fish tagging program in South Australia. It is the SA component of ANSA's national AUSTAG program. The program co-ordinates data collected by recreational anglers (ANSA members) around Australia for analysis and the studying of fish migration and growth rates.
